Krishna Arjune (born 3 September 1980) is a former Guyanese cricketer who represented Guyana and West Indies B in West Indian domestic cricket. He played as a right-handed opening batsman.

Arjune was born in Unity Village, in Guyana's Demerara-Mahaica region. His younger brother, Vishal Arjune, also played cricket at a high level. Arjune made his first-class debut in the 2001–02 Busta Cup, playing for West Indies B (an under-23 development team). In his second match of the tournament, against Trinidad and Tobago, he scored 109 not out and carried his bat. For the 2002–03 season, Arjune secured a contract with Guyana. He played seven seasons in total with the national team, with his final appearances coming in the 2008–09 Regional Four Day Competition. Arjune's highest first-class score came in the 2005–06 Carib Beer Cup, when he made 157 from 291 balls against the Leeward Islands.

References

External links
Player profile and statistics at CricketArchive
Player profile and statistics at ESPNcricinfo

1980 births
Living people
Guyana cricketers
Guyanese cricketers
Indo-Guyanese people
People from Demerara-Mahaica
West Indies B cricketers